Alexey Sokolov (born November 19, 1972, Leningrad) is a leading scientist  in railcar building and heavy haul railway technologies in the CIS. Received a degree of the St. Petersburg State Transport University. Alexey Sokolov holds scientific degree of PhD and Sc.D. in Technical Sciences.

Publications 
 VNIIZHT Bulletin (Railway Research Institute Bulletin), #1, 2012. Industry-wide technology platform high-productivity freight rolling stock as a tool for better utilization of railway carrying capacity reserves. B.M. Lapidus, A.M. Sokolov.
 VNIIZHT Bulletin (Railway Research Institute Bulletin), #1, 2015. Development of techniques to analyse technogenic hazards and risks related to railway assets. Makhutov Nikolai A., Gadenin Mikhail M., Sokolov Alexey M., Titov Evgeniy Yu.
 The fuzzy durability model synthesis method for improving the joints of rolling stock elements, 2006. A. M. Sokolov; St. Petersburg State Transport University.
 International Heavy Haul Association Conference, South Africa, 2017. Orlova A., Savushkin R., Sokolov A., Dmitriev S., Rudakova E., Krivchenkov A., Kudryavtsev M., Fedorova V. Development and testing of freight wagons for 27 t per axle loads for 1520 mm gauge railways.  // - P. 1089–1096.

References 

Living people
Engineers from Saint Petersburg
1972 births